The Roman Catholic Diocese of Guarulhos is a diocese located in the city of Guarulhos in the Ecclesiastical province of São Paulo in Brazil.

History
 30 January 1981: Established as Diocese of Guarulhos from the Diocese of Mogi das Cruzes

Bishops

Ordinaries
 Bishops of Guarulhos (Roman rite)
 Bishop João Bergese (1981.02.11 – 1991.05.05; Appointed Archbishop of Pouso Alegre)
 Bishop Luiz Gonzaga Bergonzini (1991.12.04 – 2011.11.23)
 Bishop Joaquim Justino Carreira (2011.11.23 - 2013.09.01)
 Bishop Edmilson Amador Caetano, O. Cist. (2014.01.29-)

Other priest of this diocese who became bishop
Otacilio Francisco Ferreira de Lacerda, appointed Auxiliary Bishop of Belo Horizonte, Minas Gerais

References
 GCatholic.org
 Catholic Hierarchy
 Diocese website (Portuguese)

Roman Catholic dioceses in Brazil
Christian organizations established in 1981
Guarulhos, Roman Catholic Diocese of
Roman Catholic dioceses and prelatures established in the 20th century